Darren Aronofsky (born February 12, 1969) is an American filmmaker. His films are noted for their surreal, melodramatic, and often disturbing elements, frequently in the form of psychological fiction.

Aronofsky studied film and social anthropology at Harvard University before studying directing at the AFI Conservatory. He won several film awards after completing his senior thesis film, Supermarket Sweep, which became a National Student Academy Award finalist. In 1997, he founded the film and TV production company Protozoa Pictures. His feature film debut, the surrealist psychological thriller Pi (1998), was produced for $60,000 and grossed over $3 million; it won Aronofsky the Directing Award at the Sundance Film Festival and an Independent Spirit Award for Best First Screenplay. Aronofsky's follow-up, the psychological drama Requiem for a Dream (2000), garnered strong reviews and received an Academy Award nomination for Ellen Burstyn's performance.

After writing the World War II horror film Below (2002), Aronofsky released his third film, the romantic fantasy sci-fi drama The Fountain (2006). It received mixed reviews and performed poorly at the box-office, but has since garnered a cult following. His fourth film, the sports drama The Wrestler (2008), was released to critical acclaim; both of the film's stars, Mickey Rourke and Marisa Tomei, received Academy Award nominations. His fifth film, the psychological horror Black Swan (2010), received further acclaim and many accolades, with five Academy Award nominations, including Best Picture and Best Director, and a Best Actress win for Natalie Portman. His sixth feature film, the biblically inspired epic Noah (2014), became his first film to open at No. 1 at the box office despite its mixed reception from critics and audiences. His seventh and eighth films, mother! (2017) and The Whale (2022), sparked controversy and received both widespread acclaim and criticism.

Early life
Aronofsky was born in the Brooklyn borough of New York City on February 12, 1969, the son of teachers Charlotte and Abraham Aronofsky. He grew up in Brooklyn's Manhattan Beach neighborhood. He said he was "raised culturally Jewish, but there was very little spiritual attendance in the temple. It was a cultural thing—celebrating the holidays, knowing where you came from, knowing your history, having respect for what your people have been through." He graduated from Edward R. Murrow High School. He has one sister, Patti, who attended a professional ballet school through high school. His parents would often take him to Broadway performances, which sparked his interest in show business.

During his youth, Aronofsky trained as a field biologist with The School for Field Studies in Kenya in 1985 and Alaska in 1986. He attended school in Kenya to pursue an interest in learning about ungulates. He later said that the School for Field Studies "changed the way [he] perceived the world". Aronofsky's interest in the outdoors led him to backpack his way through Europe and the Middle East. At the age of 18, he entered Harvard University, where he majored in social anthropology and studied filmmaking; he graduated in 1991. He became seriously interested in film while attending Harvard after befriending Dan Schrecker, an aspiring animator, and Sean Gullette, who would go on to star in Aronofsky's first film, Pi. His cinematic influences included Akira Kurosawa, Roman Polanski, Terry Gilliam, Shinya Tsukamoto, Hubert Selby Jr. Spike Lee, Satoshi Kon, and Jim Jarmusch.

Aronofsky's senior thesis film, Supermarket Sweep, was a finalist in the 1991 Student Academy Awards. In 1992, Aronofsky received his MFA degree in directing from the AFI Conservatory, where his classmates included Todd Field, Doug Ellin, Scott Silver, and Mark Waters. He won the institute's Franklin J. Schaffner Alumni Medal.

Career

Early work
Aronofsky's debut feature, titled Pi—sometimes stylized as π—was shot in November 1997. The film was financed in part from $100 donations from his friends and family. In return, he promised to pay each back $150 if the film made money, and they would at least get screen credit if the film lost money. Producing the film with an initial budget of $60,000, Aronofsky premiered Pi at the 1998 Sundance Film Festival, where he won the Best Director award. The film itself was nominated for a special Jury Award. Artisan Entertainment bought distribution rights for $1 million. The film was released to the public later that year to critical acclaim and it grossed a total of $3,221,152 at the box-office. Pi was the first film to be made available for download on the Internet.

Aronofsky followed his debut with Requiem for a Dream, a film based on Hubert Selby Jr.'s novel of the same name. He was paid $50,000, and worked for three years with nearly the same production team as his previous film. Following the financial breakout of Pi, he was capable of hiring established actors, including Ellen Burstyn and Jared Leto, and received a budget of $3,500,000 to produce the film. Production of the film occurred over the period of one year, with the film being released in October 2000. The film went on to gross $7,390,108 worldwide. Aronofsky received acclaim for his stylish direction, and was nominated for another Independent Spirit Award, this time for Best Director. The film itself was nominated for five awards in total, winning two, for Best Actress and Cinematography. Clint Mansell's soundtrack for the film was also well-regarded, and since their first collaboration in 1996, Mansell has composed the music to every Aronofsky film, (except for Mother!, 2017). Ellen Burstyn was nominated for numerous awards, including for an Academy Award for Best Actress, and won the Independent Spirit Award. Aronofsky was awarded the PRISM Award from the Robert Wood Johnson Foundation with the National Institute on Drug Abuse for the film's depiction of drug abuse.

In May 2000, Aronofsky was briefly attached to make an adaptation of David Wiesner's 1999 children's book Sector 7 for Nickelodeon Movies, the project remains unmade. In mid-2000, Warner Bros. hired Aronofsky to write and direct Batman: Year One, which was to be the fifth film in the Batman franchise. Aronofsky, who collaborated with Frank Miller on an unproduced script for Ronin, brought Miller to co-write Year One with him, intending to reboot the series. "It's somewhat based on the comic book", Aronofsky later said. "Toss out everything you can imagine about Batman! Everything! We're starting completely anew", who intended to re-imagine the titular character in a darker, adult-oriented and grounded style, with his adaptation aiming for an R-rating. Regular Aronofsky collaborator Matthew Libatique was set as cinematographer, and Aronofsky had also approached Christian Bale for the role of Batman. Bale was ultimately cast in the role for Batman Begins. After that project failed to develop, Aronofsky declined the opportunity to direct a film in the Batman franchise. In March 2001, he helped write the screenplay to the horror film Below, which he also produced.

In April 2001, Aronofsky entered negotiations with Warner Bros. and Village Roadshow to direct a then-untitled science fiction film, with Brad Pitt in the lead role. In June 2001, actress Cate Blanchett entered talks to join the film, which Aronofsky, wanting the title to remain secret, had given the working title of The Last Man. Production was postponed to wait for a pregnant Blanchett to give birth to her child in December 2001. Production was ultimately set for late October 2002 in Queensland and Sydney.

By now officially titled The Fountain, the film had a budget of $70 million, co-financed by Warner Bros. and New Regency, which had filled the gap after Village Roadshow withdrew. Pitt left the project seven weeks before the first day of shooting, halting production. In February 2004, Warner Bros. resurrected it on a $35 million budget with Hugh Jackman in the lead role. In August, actress Rachel Weisz filled the vacancy left by Blanchett. The Fountain was released on November 22, 2006, a day before the American Thanksgiving holiday; ultimately it grossed $15,978,422 in theaters worldwide. Audiences and critics were divided in their responses to it.

Breakthrough

In 2007, Aronofsky hired writer Scott Silver to develop The Fighter with him. Aronofsky approached Bale to star in the film, but Aronofsky dropped out because of its similarities to The Wrestler and to work on MGM's RoboCop remake. In July 2010, Aronofsky had left the project due to uncertainty over the financially distressed studio's future. When asked about the film, he said, "I think I'm still attached. I don't know. I haven't heard from anyone in a while". Later during 2007, Aronofsky said he was planning to film a movie about Noah's Ark.

Aronofsky had the idea for The Wrestler for over a decade. He hired Robert Siegel (filmmaker) to turn his idea into a script. The actor Nicolas Cage entered negotiations in October 2007 to star as Randy, the film's protagonist. The following month Cage left the project, and Mickey Rourke replaced him in the lead role. Aronofsky said that Cage pulled out of the movie because Aronofsky wanted Rourke to star; Aronofsky said, stating that Cage was "a complete gentleman, and he understood that my heart was with Mickey and he stepped aside. I have so much respect for Nic Cage as an actor and I think it really could have worked with Nic but, you know, Nic was incredibly supportive of Mickey and he is old friends with Mickey and really wanted to help with this opportunity, so he pulled himself out of the race." Cage responded, "I wasn't quote 'dropped' from the movie. I resigned from the movie because I didn't think I had enough time to achieve the look of the wrestler who was on steroids, which I would never do". The roughly 40-day shoot began in January 2008.

The Wrestler premiered at the 65th Venice International Film Festival. Initially receiving little attention, the film wound up winning the Golden Lion, the highest award at the world's oldest film festival. The Wrestler received critical acclaim, and both Rourke and co-star Marisa Tomei received Academy Award, Golden Globe, SAG, and BAFTA nominations for their performances. Rourke won a Golden Globe, as did Bruce Springsteen for his original song written for the film. The Wrestler grossed $44,674,354 worldwide on a budget of $6,000,000 making it Aronofsky's highest-grossing film to that point.

Aronofsky's next film was Black Swan, which had been in development since 2001, a psychological thriller horror film about a New York City ballerina. The film starred actress Natalie Portman, whom Aronofsky had known since 2000. She introduced Aronofsky to Mila Kunis, who joined the cast in 2009. Black Swan had its world premiere as the opening film at the 67th Venice Film Festival in September 2010. It received a standing ovation whose length Variety said made it "one of the strongest Venice openers in recent memory".

Black Swan has received high praise from film critics, and received a record 12 Broadcast Film Critics Association nominations, four Independent Spirit Award nominations, four Golden Globe nominations, three SAG nominations, and many more accolades. Aronofsky received a Golden Globe nomination for Best Director. The film broke limited-release box-office records and grossed an unexpectedly high $329,398,046. On January 25, 2011, the film was nominated for a total of five Academy Awards; Best Picture, Best Director, Best Actress, Best Cinematography and Best Film Editing. On February 27, 2011, Portman won for Best Actress. The film was awarded the PRISM Award from the Substance Abuse & Mental Health Services Administration for its depiction of mental health issues. Aronofsky served as an executive producer on The Fighter, which was also nominated for Best Picture at the Oscars and won two for Best Supporting Actor and Best Supporting Actress for Christian Bale and Melissa Leo.

Larger-budget productions

Aronofsky was attached to The Wolverine, which was scheduled to begin production in March 2011, but he left the project due to scheduling issues. The film was set to be sixth entry of the X-Men film series, featuring a story revolving around Wolverine's adventures in Japan. In April 2011, Aronofsky was announced as the President of the Jury for the 68th Venice International Film Festival.

In December 2011, Aronofsky directed the music video for Lou Reed and Metallica's "The View" from their album Lulu.

Aronofsky was set to direct an HBO series pilot called Hobgoblin. Announced on June 16, 2011, the series would have depicted a group of magicians and con artists who use their powers of deception to defeat Hitler during World War II. He was set to work on the project with Pulitzer Prize winning author Michael Chabon and his wife Ayelet Waldman. In June 2013, it was announced that HBO had dropped the show and Aronofsky had pulled out, as well.

In 2011, Aronofsky tried to launch production on Noah, a retelling of the Bible story of Noah's Ark, projected for a $115 million budget. By the following year, the film had secured funding and distribution from New Regency and Paramount Pictures, with Russell Crowe hired for the title role. The film was adapted into a serialized graphic novel written by Aronofsky and Ari Handel, published in French in October 2011 by the Belgian publisher Le Lombard. By July 2012, Aronofsky's crews were building an ark set in Oyster Bay, New York. Aronofsky announced the start of filming on Noah on Twitter in the same month, tweeting shots of the filming in Iceland. The film featured Emma Watson, Anthony Hopkins, Logan Lerman, and Jennifer Connelly, with the latter having also starred in Requiem for a Dream. During its opening weekend, Noah held the largest non-sequel opening within Russia and Brazil, and the fourth-largest opening of all time. Aronofsky did not use live animals for the film, saying in a PETA video that "there's really no reason to do it anymore because the technology has arrived". The Humane Society of the United States gave him their inaugural Humane Filmmaker Award in honor of his use of computer-generated animals. That same year, he was announced as the President of the Jury for the 65th Berlin International Film Festival for February 2015. 

Aronofsky's next film, mother!, was released by Paramount Pictures on September 15, 2017. It stars Jennifer Lawrence, Javier Bardem, Michelle Pfeiffer, Domhnall Gleeson, Ed Harris and Kristen Wiig. The film sparked controversy upon release for its depiction of violence, and, though it received generally positive reviews, it polarized audiences, becoming one of few films to receive a "F" CinemaScore grade. On review aggregator Rotten Tomatoes, the film has an approval rating of 69% based on 278 reviews, and an average rating of 6.8/10. The site's critical consensus reads, "There's no denying that mother! is the thought-provoking product of a singularly ambitious artistic vision, though it may be too unwieldy for mainstream tastes."

His next film would be "A courtroom drama of Artificial intelligence", in which he would cooperate again with Paramount Pictures, having doing so in mother!. In 2018, he was the co-executive producer of SPHERES, a virtual reality journey through the universe, that was acquired in a seven figure deal at the 2018 Sundance Film Festival. In January 2021, his next film was announced to be The Whale, a film adaptation of Samuel D. Hunter's play of the same name, starring Brendan Fraser.

Nonfiction work
In 2018, Aronofsky executive produced One Strange Rock for NatGeo. This 10-part cinematic event series explores the fragility and wonder of planet Earth—one of the most peculiar, unique places in the universe. Host Will Smith guides viewers on an unprecedented exploration, bolstered by an elite group of eight astronauts who provide unique perspectives and relate personal memoirs of the planet seen from a distance. Hourlong episodes delve into monumental events such as genesis, cosmic violence, human intelligence and alien life, oxygen, and survival vs. destruction. The series is now available on Disney Plus. A second season, titled Welcome to Earth is currently in production and expected to premiere this year. Aronofsky is also producing Limitless for NatGeo. This upcoming series features Chris Hemsworth as it delves into the science of longevity and how to live better and longer.

In 2020, Aronofsky produced director Lance Oppenheim's debut feature documentary, Some Kind of Heaven. Set in The Villages retirement community in Florida, the film follows four residents who struggle to fit into the community's prepackaged paradise. The film premiered at the Sundance Film Festival before being released by Magnolia Pictures in 2021. It's now available on Hulu.

Directing style

Aronofsky's first two films, Pi and Requiem for a Dream, were low budget and used montages of extremely short shots, also known as hip hop montages. While an average 100-minute film has 600 to 700 cuts, Requiem for a Dream features more than 2,000. Split-screen is used extensively, along with extremely tight closeups. Long tracking shots, including those shot with an apparatus strapping a camera to an actor, called the Snorricam, and time-lapse photography are also prominent stylistic devices. Often with his films, Aronofsky alternates between extreme closeups and extreme wide shots to create a sense of isolation.

With The Fountain, Aronofsky restricted the use of computer-generated imagery. Henrik Fett, the visual effects supervisor of Look Effects, said, "Darren was quite clear on what he wanted and his intent to greatly minimize the use of computer graphics ... and I think the results are outstanding." He used more subtle directing in The Wrestler and Black Swan, in which a less-visceral directing style better showcases the acting and narratives. Aronofsky filmed both works with a muted palette and a grainy style. Part of this consistent style involves collaborations with frequent partners cinematographer Matthew Libatique, editor Andrew Weisblum and composer Clint Mansell. Mansell's music is often an important element of the films.

Themes and influences
Pi features several references to mathematics and mathematical theories. In a 1998 interview, Aronofsky acknowledged several influences for Pi: "I'm a big fan of Kurosawa and Fellini. In this film in particular I think there's a lot of Roman Polanski influence and Terry Gilliam influence as well as a Japanese director named Shinya Tsukamoto—he directed The Iron Man, Tetsuo." The visual style of Pi and Requiem for a Dream features numerous similarities to Tetsuo: The Iron Man.

The majority of reviewers characterized Requiem for a Dream in the genre of "drug movies", along with films like The Basketball Diaries, Trainspotting, Spun, and Fear and Loathing in Las Vegas. But, Aronofsky placed his movie in a wider context, saying:
Dream logic is another leitmotif.

With his friend Ari Handel, Aronofsky developed the plot for The Fountain; the director wrote the screenplay. In 1999, Aronofsky thought that The Matrix redefined the science fiction genre in film. He sought to make a science fiction film that explored new territory, as did The Matrix and its predecessors Star Wars and 2001: A Space Odyssey. He wanted to go beyond science fiction films with plots driven by technology and science.

In the Toronto International Film Festival interview conducted by James Rocchi, Aronofsky credited the 1957 Charles Mingus song "The Clown" as a major influence on The Wrestler. It is an instrumental piece, with a poem read over the music about a clown who accidentally discovers the bloodlust of the crowds and eventually kills himself in performance.

Aronofsky called Black Swan a companion piece to The Wrestler, recalling one of his early projects about a love affair between a wrestler and a ballerina. He eventually separated the wrestling and the ballet worlds, considering them as "too much for one movie". He compared the two films: "Wrestling some consider the lowest art—if they would even call it art—and ballet some people consider the highest art. But what was amazing to me was how similar the performers in both of these worlds are. They both make incredible use of their bodies to express themselves." About the psychological thriller nature of Black Swan, actress Natalie Portman compared the film's tone to Polanski's 1968 film Rosemary's Baby, while Aronofsky said Polanski's Repulsion (1965) and The Tenant (1976) were "big influences" on the final film. Actor Vincent Cassel also compared Black Swan to Polanski's early films, commenting that it was also influenced by Alejandro Jodorowsky's movies and David Cronenberg's early work.

Aronofsky has also mentioned that he "learned a lot" from Jean-Luc Godard's film Breathless.

Reception to films

Requiem for a Dream was originally set for release in 2000, but it was met with controversy in the United States, being rated NC-17 by the MPAA due to a graphic sex scene. Aronofsky appealed the rating, claiming that cutting any portion of the film would dilute its message. The appeal was denied and the film's distributor Artisan Entertainment decided to release the film unrated.

The question of who had designed 40 ballet costumes for Portman and the dancers in Black Swan was one publicized controversy related to the film. The media gave substantial coverage to the dance double controversy: how much credit for the dancing in the film was being given to Portman and how much to her "dance double", Sarah Lane, an American Ballet Theatre soloist. Lane claimed to have danced more than she was credited. The director and Fox Searchlight disputed Lane's claim. Their released statements said, "We were fortunate to have Sarah there to cover the more complicated dance sequences and we have nothing but praise for the hard work she did. However, Natalie herself did most of the dancing featured in the final film."

Aronofsky said in an interview with Entertainment Weekly:

While Aronofsky's other movies have evoked significant emotional response, they were surpassed by the controversy aroused by Noah. It was screened for the first time on March 28, 2014, and despite its PG-13 rating, it has quickly been recognized by Box Office Mojo as one of the most controversial movies of the last 35 years along with such titles as The Passion of the Christ or The Da Vinci Code. Noah has been banned in United Arab Emirates, Qatar, and Indonesia on religious grounds with other countries following suit.

Aronofsky's films have also been criticized for content and casting. His seventh film mother! (2017) sparked controversy upon release due to its graphic and disturbing content, polarizing both critics and audiences. His eighth film The Whale (2022) also received controversy for lead star Brendan Fraser wearing a prosthetic suit; and for casting the heterosexual Fraser as a homosexual character. Some critics labeled the film's messaging relating to its lead character's obesity as fatphobic. In preparing for the role, Fraser consulted the Obesity Action Coalition (OAC) and conversed with members of the group about their life experiences. The OAC recognized the controversial use of prosthetics in portraying obesity, but the organization supported its role in the film because it helped "realistically portray one person's story with obesity, something rarely seen in media" rather than existing to "demean or ridicule".

Environmental activism
Aronofsky is known for his environmental activism. A number of his films, notably Noah and mother!, can be read as environmental parables. In 2014 he traveled to the Alberta Tar Sands with the Sierra Club's Michael Brune and Leonardo DiCaprio. In 2015, he traveled to Alaska's Arctic National Wildlife Refuge with Brune, Keri Russell, and the leaders of several veterans groups.

In 2014, he received the Humane Filmmaker Award from the Humane Society of the United States.

In 2015, he collaborated with the artist JR on The Standing March, a public art installation in Paris encouraging diplomats at COP21 to take action against climate change.

He coproduced the 2022 documentary The Territory about a Brazilian rainforest tribe's fight to protect its existence from encroaching land grabbers.

He is a board member of the Sierra Club Foundation and The School for Field Studies.

Personal life
Aronofsky began dating English actress Rachel Weisz in 2001, and they were engaged in 2005. They lived in Manhattan's East Village and had a son on May 31, 2006. In November 2010, they announced that they had been separated for months but were raising their son together. In September 2016, he began dating American actress Jennifer Lawrence, whom he met during the filming of mother! The relationship ended in November 2017.

Since 2018, he has been dating Russian actress Aglaya Tarasova.

Aronofsky said of his spiritual beliefs in 2014, "I think I definitely believe. My biggest expression of what I believe is in The Fountain."

Filmography

Feature films

Student short films

Other credits 

Executive producer
 The Fighter (2010)
 Zipper (2015)
 Serendipity (2020)
 Limitless with Chris Hemsworth (2022)

Other productions

Accolades

Directed Academy Award performances

Aronofsky has directed multiple Oscar nominated performances.

See also
 Darren Aronofsky's unrealized projects

References

External links

Laine, Tarja (2015) Bodies in Pain: Emotion and the Cinema of Darren Aronofsky, Berghahn Books.
Skorin-Kapov, Jadranka (2015) Darren Aronofsky's Films and the Fragility of Hope, Bloomsbury Academic.

 
1969 births
Living people
Activists from New York City
AFI Conservatory alumni
American film producers
American male screenwriters
Camp Rising Sun alumni
Harvard College alumni
Jewish American screenwriters
Jewish American film producers
Jewish American film directors
Directors of Golden Lion winners
Horror film directors
Independent Spirit Award winners
Independent Spirit Award for Best Director winners
Writers from Brooklyn
Film directors from New York City
American music video directors
Sierra Club people
Screenwriters from New York (state)
Edward R. Murrow High School alumni
People from Manhattan Beach, Brooklyn
People from the East Village, Manhattan
Postmodernist filmmakers